Vladimir Malakhov is the name of:

Vladimir Malakhov (ice hockey) (born 1968), ice hockey player
Vladimir Malakhov (dancer) (born 1968), ballet dancer
Vladimir Malakhov (chess player) (born 1980), chess player and physicist
Vladimir Malakhov (footballer) (born 1955), football (soccer) player